The 2016–17 FC Zbrojovka Brno season is the 104th season in club history.

Squad

Current squad

Transfers

In

Out

Friendly matches

Czech First League

League table

References

FC Zbrojovka Brno seasons
Brno